Mulla Nasruddin was a television programme on Doordarshan, which aired in 1990. The titular role was played by Raghubir Yadav.

The episodes were based on stories of Nasreddin (Dastan-e-Nasruddin were credited in this show), a 13th-century wise man, whose wisdom can be found in folk tales from Turkey to China. The show was directed by Amal Allana, with music by Louis Banks and script by S.M. Mehdi.

Cast 
 Raghubir Yadav as Mullah Nasruddin
 Zohra Sehgal as Story Teller
 Manohar Singh as Mirza Lang 
 Saurabh Shukla as a spy
 Vijay Kashyap as Amir
Samina Mishra as Guljaan
 Mohd Ayub as Hasan
 Yusuf Hussain as Deputy Prime Minister

References

External links 
 Watch an episode of Mulla Nasiruddin on YouTube
Mulla Nasruddin short stories

DD National original programming
Indian comedy television series
1990 Indian television series debuts
1990 Indian television series endings
Indian historical television series
Television shows set in Turkey
Nasreddin
Television series set in the Middle East
Television series about Islam
Islam in popular culture
Islam in fiction
Sultanate of Rum
Seljuk Empire
Sufi fiction